The statue of Alfred the Great, in the Wantage market place, was sculpted by Count Gleichen, a relative of Queen Victoria's, and unveiled on 14 July 1877 by the Prince and Princess of Wales. It was presented to the town by Robert Loyd-Lindsay, 1st Baron Wantage. It depicts the 9th-century King Alfred the Great.

The Grade II listed statue was vandalised on New Year's Eve 2007, losing part of its right arm and axe. After the arm and axe were replaced the statue was again vandalised on Christmas Eve 2008, losing its axe.

See also
Alfred the Great

References

Grade II listed buildings in Oxfordshire
Alfred the Great
1877 sculptures
Alfred
Royal monuments in the United Kingdom
Alfred
Cultural depictions of Alfred the Great
Wantage